Alex Brenes (born January 17, 1964) is a Costa Rican professional poker player.

Brenes was the winner of a World Poker Tour title in 2005 and is the younger brother of professional poker players Humberto Brenes and Eric Brenes, the three of them together are known as "Godfather of Costa Rican players,". Brenes resides in Rohrmosser, Costa Rica.

World Series of Poker 
Brenes has cashed 22 times at the World Series of Poker (WSOP), making three final tables and finished as runner-up in two of them, the first was in the $3,500 No Limit Hold'em event where he finish runner-up to Mike Matusow in 1999  the next was to Jim Lester in the $3,000 Texas Fixed-Limit Hold'em in 2001.

Brenes has also cashed in the money twice at the WSOP Main Event, 24th in the 2001 event and 197th in the 2004 event.

World Poker Tour 
Brenes has cashed four times at the World Poker Tour title events, and won the WPT Invitational - Season 3 tournament at the 2005 L.A. Poker Classic, earning $100,000.

Other poker events 
On May 5, 2008, Brenes was a participant at the inaugural Latin American Poker Tour (LAPT) in the LAPT Rio de Janeiro event in Brazil and made the Final Table finishing fourth, earning $62,800 then later that year in August he finished runner-up at the LAPT Punta del Este $2,700 No Limit Hold'em Main Event earning an addition $127,625

As of 2009, his total live tournament winnings exceed $1,100,000. His 22 cashes as the WSOP account for $402,817 of those winnings.

Notes

External links 
World Poker Tour profile: Alex Brenes

1964 births
Living people
People from San José, Costa Rica
Costa Rican poker players
World Poker Tour winners
People from Miami Lakes, Florida